The Juwi GmbH is a company which builds renewable power supply facilities.
Founded by Fred Jung and Matthias Willenbacher in 1996, in Rhineland-Palatinate, Germany.
The today's headquarters is in Wörrstadt. The name "juwi" is an acronym based on the initials of its two founders.

In its early days Juwi was a two-man company. Today Juwi has over 900 employees and 900 million Euro revenue.

Solar parks are built by Juwi, for example Waldpolenz Solar Park.

References

External links 
 Official website of Juwi-USA
 

Companies based in Rhineland-Palatinate
Renewable energy technology companies